Simone Cavalli (born 10 January 1979) is a former Italian footballer.

Cavalli made his Serie A debut on 28 August 2005 against Roma and his Liga I debut against Astra Ploiesti on 28 February 2011.

Biography

Modena

Chievo
Cavalli left for A.C. ChievoVerona in co-ownership deal circa 2000. In June 2001 Chievo acquired Cavalli outright as well as bought back defender Nicola Legrottaglie.

Cesena
Cavalli was signed by Cesena in June 2004 for €150,000 in co-ownership deal. In June 2005 Cesena acquired Cavalli outright for an undisclosed fee.

Reggina 
In August 2005 he was signed by Reggina Calcio for an undisclosed fee. Cesena also signed defender Giovanni Morabito from Reggina as part of the deal. Cavalli made his Serie A debut for Reggina.

Vicenza 
In January 2006 he was signed by Vicenza Calcio for €775,000. In August 2005 Reggina also acquired Davide Biondini for €500,000 in co-ownership deal. Circa January 2006 Reggina acquired Biondini outright for another €700,000. Reggina also signed Luca Rigoni for €900,000 in August and sold back to Vicenza in June for €1 million, as well as Vicenza signed Ricardo Esteves from Reggina for €500,000 in August and sold back to Calabria in June for the same fee.

Bari
Cavalli was signed by A.S. Bari on 31 August 2007 in another co-ownership deal for €500,000. In June 2008 Bari acquired Cavalli outright for another €280,000. On 2 January 2009 he was signed by Frosinone. On 14 August 2009 he was signed by A.C. Mantova.

Late career
In mid-2010 he left for the third division club A.S. Andria BAT. In December 2010 he was released. Cavalli spent a year in Romania before he was signed by Italian Serie D club Voghera circa November 2011.

In July 2012 Cavalli was signed by Eccellenza Emilia-Romagna club Colorno. In December 2012 he joined another Eccellenza club Savignanese. In 2013, he joined Promozione club Castelvetro.

Footnotes

References

External links
 AIC porifle (data by football.it) 
 
 Simone Cavalli Biography & Videos
 
 

Italian footballers
Modena F.C. players
Montevarchi Calcio Aquila 1902 players
A.C. ChievoVerona players
Carrarese Calcio players
Calcio Lecco 1912 players
A.C.R. Messina players
S.S. Teramo Calcio players
A.C. Cesena players
Reggina 1914 players
L.R. Vicenza players
S.S.C. Bari players
Frosinone Calcio players
Mantova 1911 players
S.S. Fidelis Andria 1928 players
ACF Gloria Bistrița players
ASA 2013 Târgu Mureș players
A.S.D. AVC Vogherese 1919 players
Serie A players
Serie B players
Serie C players
Liga I players
Expatriate footballers in Romania
Italian expatriate sportspeople in Romania
Italian expatriate footballers
Association football forwards
Sportspeople from Parma
1979 births
Living people
Footballers from Emilia-Romagna